Walter Gross (born 30 October 1915, date of death unknown) was a Swiss racing cyclist. He rode in the 1939 Tour de France.

References

1915 births
Year of death missing
Swiss male cyclists
Place of birth missing